The Extraordinary and Plenipotentiary Ambassador of Peru to New Zealand is the official representative of the Republic of Peru to New Zealand.

Both countries established relations on June 1, 1972. Peru maintained an embassy in Wellington until its closure in 2010. The ambassador in Canberra became accredited to New Zealand until the reopening of the embassy in 2019.

List of representatives

See also
List of ambassadors of Peru to Australia

References

New Zealand
Peru